Kume Keiichiro (11 September 1866, Saga – 29 July  1934, Tokyo)  was a Japanese painter in the yōga style. His father was the historian, Kume Kunitake.

Biography 
His father moved his family to Tokyo in 1874 after participating in the Iwakura Mission. In 1881, he attended the National Industrial Exhibition, which was primarily devoted to the economy, but also included paintings. He was deeply impressed by the Western-style art and decided to become a painter. In pursuit of the goal, he began taking lessons from Fuji Masazō (1853–1916), who had studied in Europe. 

When Fuji returned to France in 1885, he followed him as soon as he could and, with Fuji's help, gained admission to the Académie Colarossi, where he studied under Raphaël Collin. While there, he became lifelong friends with Kuroda Seiki, who painted several portraits of him.

He returned to Japan in 1893, followed shortly after by Kuroda. In 1894, they founded an art school called the Tenshin-dōjō (roughly, Heavenly Dojo), which numbered many famous artists among its graduates; notably Okada Saburōsuke. They collaborated again in 1896 to help create the artists' association, Hakuba-kai (roughly; White Horse Club, a name that was chosen during a drinking party).  

In 1898, he was appointed a Professor at what is now the Tokyo University of the Arts and, the following year, was part of a group of art educators that paid an official visit to France. Later, he travelled to the United States to work for the Louisiana Purchase Exhibition (1904) and the Panama–Pacific International Exposition (1915). He also served as a juror for the annual exhibitions at the Japan Art Academy.

His descendants have established an art gallery dedicated to him at a family business in Meguro.

Selected paintings

References

Further reading 
 Un peintre japonais à Bréhat : Keiichirô Kume, by Mme. Fumiko Ito, conservator of the Kume Museum – , No. 20 (2004), Bulletin de la Société d'études historiques et archéologique du Goëlo.
 Bru, Ricard, "Kume Keiichiro. Un pintor japonés en la España del siglo XIX", in Goya, Madrid, 2009, pp. 236–250.
 Thomas Rimer, et al., Paris in Japan. The Japanese Encounter with European Painting, Washington University in St. Louis Art Gallery, 1987.

External links 

 Kume Museum, homepage (in Japanese)

1866 births
1934 deaths
People from Saga Prefecture
19th-century Japanese painters
20th-century Japanese painters
Yōga painters
Académie Colarossi alumni